In the Present – Live from Lyon is a 2-CD/DVD live album by Yes, released on 29 November 2011 in North America and 2 December 2011 in Europe.

Overview 
In the Present – Live from Lyon is a recording of a Yes show on 1 December 2009 at the Bourse du Travail, Lyon, France as a part of their In the Present Tour which they undertook before the release of their new studio album Fly from Here (2011) featuring newcomer Benoît David on lead vocals.

It is the first live album featuring lead vocalist Benoît David (from Mystery) and thus the first live album without ex-member Jon Anderson, whom David replaced. It was also the only release with Oliver Wakeman as a member of the band, until the release of the From a Page album in 2019.

Track listing
Disc 1

Disc 2

DVD

Personnel
Benoît David – lead vocals, acoustic guitars, percussions
Steve Howe – guitars, pedal steel guitar, backing vocals
Chris Squire – bass, backing vocals
Oliver Wakeman – keyboards
Alan White – drums

References

External links
YesWorld - Official Yes Website

Yes (band) video albums
Live video albums
2011 live albums
Albums with cover art by Roger Dean (artist)